Efim Etkind (26 February 1918, Petrograd – 22 November 1999, Potsdam) was a Soviet philologist and translation theorist. In the 1960s and 1970s he was a dissident; from 1974 he lived in France.

Works
Books
 
 
 
 
 
 
 
 
 
 
 
 
 
 
 
 
 
 
 
 
 
 
 
 
 
 
 
 
 

Articles

Further reading

Notes

1918 births
1999 deaths
Writers from Saint Petersburg
Saint Petersburg State University alumni
Russian philologists
Soviet literary historians
Soviet male writers
20th-century male writers
Soviet dissidents
20th-century translators
People denaturalized by the Soviet Union
Soviet emigrants to France
Members of the Bavarian Academy of Sciences
20th-century philologists
Academic staff of Herzen University